Marieke Hommels is a former Dutch woman cricketer. She made her international debut for Netherlands in the 1995 Women's European Cricket Cup.

References

External links 

Living people
Dutch women cricketers
Year of birth missing (living people)
Place of birth missing (living people)
Netherlands women One Day International cricketers